JSW Vijayanagar Power Station is a coal-based thermal power plant located in Toranagallu village in Bellary district Karnataka. The power plant is operated by the JSW Energy Limited.

The coal for the plant is imported.

Capacity
It has an installed capacity of 1460 MW (2x130, 4x300 MW). The first two units of 130 MW each became operational in year 2000 and other two units of 300 MW each became operational in year 2009.Two more units were set up later as CPP each 300 MW became operational in year 2012 to meet the energy requirement of JSW steel limited.

References

Coal-fired power stations in Karnataka
Buildings and structures in Bellary district
JSW Energy
Energy infrastructure completed in 2000
2000 establishments in Karnataka
20th-century architecture in India